What? (Che?, also variously titled Quoi?, Was?, and Diary of Forbidden Dreams) is a 1972 comedy film co-written and directed by Roman Polanski and starring Marcello Mastroianni, Sydne Rome, and Hugh Griffith.

Plot
Set in an unnamed coastal city in Italy, the film tells a story of an American girl, Nancy, who takes shelter in a villa filled with strange guests. There, she gets into a relationship with a retired pimp, Alex.

Cast
 Marcello Mastroianni as Alex
 Sydne Rome as Nancy
 Hugh Griffith as Joseph Noblart
 Guido Alberti as Priest
 Gianfranco Piacentini as Tony
 Carlo Delle Piane as Young Oaf #1 in Car
 Mario Bussolino as Young Oaf #2 in Car
 Henning Schlüter as Catone
 Christiane Barry as Dresser
 Pietro Tordi as Man-Servant
 Nerina Montagnani as Chambermaid
 Mogens von Gadow as German
 Dieter Hallervorden as German
 Elisabeth Witte as Baby
 John Karlsen as Edward
 Roger Middleton as Jimmy (uncredited)
 Roman Polanski as Mosquito (uncredited)
Alvaro Vitali

Production
The film was shot on location in Amalfi, Italy, in a villa owned by the producer, Carlo Ponti. Some of the action was improvised.

Reception
John Simon of the National Review described What? as a 'monstrous fiasco'.

References

External links 
 

1972 films
1972 comedy films
French comedy films
Italian comedy films
West German films
Films directed by Roman Polanski
Films with screenplays by Gérard Brach
Films with screenplays by Roman Polanski
Films produced by Carlo Ponti
Films set in Italy
English-language French films
English-language German films
English-language Italian films
1970s Italian films
1970s French films